Myles Hartsfield (born August 5, 1997) is an American football safety for the San Francisco 49ers of the National Football League (NFL). He played college football at Ole Miss.

Early life and high school
Hartsfield grew up in Sayreville, New Jersey and attended Sayreville War Memorial High School, where he played football and was a triple jumper on the track team. He initially committed to play college football at Penn State, but his scholarship was revoked after the Sayreville football team was suspended due to a hazing scandal. After his senior year, he enrolled at East Coast Prep (ECP) for a postgraduate year. At East Coast Prep, Hartsfield recorded 29 tackles, seven pass break-ups and two interceptions and had over 200 receiving yards and four touchdowns on offense. At the end to the season he committed to play at Ole Miss over offers from UCLA and Boston College.

College career
Hartsfield was a member of the Ole Miss Rebels for four seasons. As a freshman, he finished fifth on the team with 43 tackles and a pass defended and was named a third-team freshman All-American by Athlon Sports. The following year, he made 42 tackles with two interceptions and five passes defended. Hartsfield recorded 41 tackles and led the Rebels with seven passes defended in his junior season. As a senior, he recorded 41 tackles, 2.5 tackles for loss, and one sack with one interception and four passes broken up. Hartsfield finished his collegiate career with 167 career tackles, 8.0 tackles for loss, three interceptions and 17 passes broken up in 48 games played.

Professional career
Hartsfield was signed by the Carolina Panthers as an undrafted free agent on April 25, 2020. He practiced both at safety and running back in training camp and made the active roster at the end of the preseason. Hartsfield made his NFL debut on September 13, 2020, in the season opener against the Las Vegas Raiders.

On September 13, 2021, Hartsfield was placed on injured reserve with a wrist injury. He was activated on November 6. In the season finale against the Tampa Bay Buccaneers, Hartsfield recorded his first career sack on Tom Brady.

On March 20, Hartsfield signed with the 49ers.

References

External links
Ole Miss Rebels bio
Carolina Panthers bio

1997 births
Living people
Players of American football from New Jersey
Sayreville War Memorial High School alumni
Sportspeople from Middlesex County, New Jersey
American football cornerbacks
Ole Miss Rebels football players
People from Sayreville, New Jersey
Carolina Panthers players
San Francisco 49ers players